The Lanesville Christadelphian Church, located at 7442 Mount Olive Cohoke Road in King William County, Virginia, was listed on the National Register of Historic Places on January 14, 2019.

References

External links
 

King William County, Virginia
National Register of Historic Places in Virginia